Nenad Živanović (born 20 July 1980) is a Serbian football defender.

Živanović made his first appearance in the Serbian Superliga during the 2010–11 season.

References

External links

1980 births
Living people
Serbian footballers
Association football midfielders
MŠK Rimavská Sobota players
Slovak Super Liga players
FK Budućnost Valjevo players
FK Inđija players
FK Sloga Kraljevo players
Sportspeople from Valjevo